Lúrint Ó Lachtnáin (? – ), also known as Laurentius, was elected Bishop of Kilmacduagh before 10 August 1290 and received possession of the temporalities after that date. Prior to that he was Abbot of Knockmoy Abbey, near present-day Abbeyknockmoy, Ireland.

References
 http://www.ucc.ie/celt/published/T100005C/
 http://www.irishtimes.com/ancestor/surname/index.cfm?fuseaction=Go.&UserID=
 The Surnames of Ireland, Edward MacLysaght, 1978.

13th-century Roman Catholic bishops in Ireland
14th-century Roman Catholic bishops in Ireland
13th-century Irish abbots
People from County Galway